Freddie Frinton (born Frederick Bittiner Coo; 17 January 1909 – 16 October 1968) was an English comedian, and music hall and television actor. He is primarily remembered today as a household name in several Central European countries for his 1963 television comedic sketch entitled Dinner for One, a perennial national television broadcast New Year's Eve favourite there, whilst being largely forgotten in his home country.

Early life
Frinton was born in Hainton Avenue, Grimsby, Lincolnshire, the child of a seamstress, Florence Elisabeth Coo (born 1892), and was brought up by foster parents. He started working in a Grimsby fish processing plant, where he is said to have entertained his colleagues with parodies and jokes, but was eventually sacked. He moved into music hall, where he enjoyed modest success and renamed himself Freddie Frinton.

Career
During the Second World War he made a moderate breakthrough as a comedian. In 1945, Frinton first performed the sketch Dinner for One in Blackpool. As he had to pay a royalty every time he performed the sketch, he bought the rights to Dinner for One in the 1950s, which turned out to be a fateful decision.

In 1964, at the age of 55, Frinton became a belated success as the plumber husband in the popular television sitcom Meet the Wife, which ran for 40 episodes (the wife was played by Thora Hird). The series is mentioned in the Beatles song "Good Morning Good Morning" with the line "It's time for tea and Meet the Wife".

Dinner for One
In 1963, Frinton's Dinner for One was recorded by the Norddeutscher Rundfunk (NDR) German television station. The role of Miss Sophie was played by May Warden. Watching the (unsubtitled) English language sketch on television has subsequently become a Danish, German, Austrian, Finnish, and Swiss New Year's Eve tradition, with multiple repeats of the comedy short being shown every year from 1972 onwards.

Dinner for One also found fame in Scandinavia where it has been a hugely popular institution on Norwegian, Danish, Finnish, Estonian and Swedish television on New Year's Eve for many years, as well as in Belgium in the original version. It has become so popular that several versions in various German dialects have been produced and a version was made for Dutch viewers, with the Dutch actor Joop Doderer playing Frinton's role. It is shown every 23 December on Norwegian television (NRK since 1980), and has been shown on the Australian SBS television network on New Year's Eve for at least the last fifteen years. It also became a family tradition in South Africa when the SABC aired it every New Year's Eve during the 1980s and 1990s. The TV short and its main actor Frinton are far less renowned in Britain than in any of these countries.

Although Frinton originated from Lincolnshire, England, his most famous comedy short has never been shown in full on British television. It received its first UK screening on 23 November 2018 (more than 50 years after it was made) at the Picture House in Campbeltown, Argyll and Bute, as part of a comedy film festival. The skit was broadcast to a British audience for the first time on 31 December 2018 on the Sky Arts channel.

Personal life
Although he was an actor whose roles often comprised playing being inebriated, Frinton was teetotal in real life, having seen in others the damage that alcohol could do.

Frinton was married twice and had five children. His first marriage was to Maisie Basil in 1931; they had one son together. His second wife was Nora Gratton, whom he married in 1945. They had four children: two daughters and two sons.

Death
On 16 October 1968, Frinton died suddenly from a heart attack in London at the age of 59. His body was buried in the City of Westminster Cemetery, in London.

Partial filmography

References

External links 
 

1909 births
1968 deaths
English male comedians
English male actors
People from Grimsby
Music hall performers
20th-century English male actors
20th-century English comedians